This is a list of banks in the Macau Special Administrative Region of the People's Republic of China. According to the Monetary Authority of Macao, there are 27 licensed banks in Macau, 4 of which are headquartered in Macau.

Note-issuing banks 
 Banco Nacional Ultramarino, S.A. - Banco Nacional Ultramarino, S.A.
 Banco da China, Sucursal de Macau

Banks incorporated in Macau 
 OCBC Wing Hang Bank Limited  - Banco Weng Hang, S.A.
 Banco Delta Asia Limited - Banco Delta Ásia, S.A.R.L.
 China Construction Bank (Macau) Corporation Limited - Banco de Construçao da China (Macau), S.A.
 Industrial and Commercial Bank of China (Macau) - Banco Industrial e Comércial da China (Macau), S.A.
 Luso International Banking Limited - Banco Luso Internacional, S.A.
 Banco Comercial de Macau, S.A. - Banco Comercial de Macau, S.A.
 The Macau Chinese Bank Ltd. - Banco Chinês de Macau, S.A.
 Banco Nacional Ultramarino, S.A. - Banco Nacional Ultramarino, S.A.
 Well Link Bank - Banco Well Link, S.A.
 Tai Fung Bank Limited, S.A.  - Banco Tai Fung, S.A.

Branches of banks incorporated outside Macau 
 Bank of China Limited - Bank of China Limited
 HSBC - HSBC Macau
 Citibank - Citibank Macau
 Standard Chartered Bank - Standard Chartered Bank
 Guangdong Development  Bank Co., Ltd. - Banco de Desenvolvimento de Cantão, S.A.
 Bank SinoPac Company Limited - Banco SinoPac company Limited
 Chong Hing Bank Limited - Chong Hing Bank Limited
 The Bank of East Asia Limited - Banco da East Asia, Limitada
 Hang Seng Bank Limited - Hang Seng Bank Limited
 CITIC Ka Wah Bank Limited - CITIC Ka Wah Bank Limited
 Banco Comercial Português, S.A. -  Banco Comercial Português, S.A.

Subsidiary of banks incorporated outside Macau 

 Caixa Geral de Depósitos - Subsidiária Offshore de Macau, S.A. - Caixa Geral de Depósitos - Subsidiária Offshore de Macau, S.A.

List of largest banks in Macau
List of largest banks in Macau as of 2020.

References

 
Banks
Macau